Brian Stanley Mawhinney, Baron Mawhinney,  (26 July 1940 – 9 November 2019) was a British Conservative Party politician. He was a member of the Cabinet from 1994 to 1997 and a member of Parliament (MP) from 1979 to 2005.

Early life
Mawhinney was born on 26 July 1940 in Belfast, son of Frederick Stanley Arnot Mawhinney and Coralie Jean (née Wilkinson). He was educated at the Royal Belfast Academical Institution. He studied physics at Queen's University Belfast, gaining an upper second class degree in 1963 and obtained a PhD in radiation physics at the Royal Free Hospital in London in 1969 with thesis title Studies on the effects of radiation on mammalian bone grown in vitro. He worked as assistant professor of radiation research at the University of Iowa from 1968 to 1970 and then returned to the Royal Free Hospital School of Medicine as a lecturer from 1970 to 1984.

Political career
Mawhinney contested Stockton-on-Tees in October 1974 but lost to Labour incumbent, Bill Rodgers. Mawhinney served as Member of Parliament for Peterborough from 1979 to 1997 and Member of Parliament for North West Cambridgeshire from 1997 to 2005. Mawhinney campaigned prolifically against pornography. In 1979 one of his bills was in the Private Members' Bills ballot, which attempted to ban indecent displays outside cinemas, sex shops and strip clubs. In early 1980, he called for Keith Joseph to launch an inquiry into a page on the Post Office's Prestel viewdata service, called "A Buyer's Guide to Dirty Books".

In Government
He was PPS to John Wakeham from 1982 to 1983, and PPS to Tom King from 1984 to 1986. He became a junior minister at the Northern Ireland Office in 1986, and then became Minister of State at the Northern Ireland Office in 1990. In 1992, he became Minister of State at the Department of Health until 1994.

Cabinet
Having been sworn of the Privy Council in the 1994 New Year Honours, he entered the Cabinet as Secretary of State for Transport that year. He served as Chairman of the Conservative Party and Minister without Portfolio for two years from 1995 until the 1997 election. He was knighted in the 1997 Prime Minister's Resignation Honours.

In Opposition
He served as Shadow Home Secretary and spokesman for home, constitutional and legal affairs for a year under William Hague before returning to the back benches in June 1998. He stepped down from the House of Commons in April 2005.

House of Lords
On 13 May 2005 it was announced that he would be created a life peer in the 2005 Dissolution Honours, and on 24 June he was created Baron Mawhinney, of Peterborough, in the County of Cambridgeshire.

Lord Mawhinney questioned the priority David Cameron had given to the Marriage (Same Sex Couples) Act 2013, stating that it was a distraction.

He took leave of absence from the House of Lords in October 2017.

Outside politics
In 2003, he was appointed chairman of The Football League, and in 2004 oversaw a re-organisation of the league structure, renaming the former Division One as the Football League Championship. Deeply religious, Mawhinney was a leading member of the Conservative Christian Fellowship as well as a member of the Church of England General Synod for five years. He was also president of Christians in Sport. Mawhinney was also a patron of Peterborough United until his death in November 2019.

Personal life and death
Mawhinney had two sons and a daughter with his wife Betty, a United States citizen. He listed Anglo-American relations among his interests.

Mawhinney died on 9 November 2019, aged 79.

See also
 List of Northern Ireland members of the House of Lords
 List of Northern Ireland members of the Privy Council of the United Kingdom

References

External links 
 

|-

|-

|-

|-

|-

1940 births
2019 deaths
Alumni of Queen's University Belfast
British Secretaries of State
Chairmen of the Conservative Party (UK)
Conservative Party (UK) life peers
Conservative Party (UK) MPs for English constituencies
Knights Bachelor
Members of the Privy Council of the United Kingdom
People educated at the Royal Belfast Academical Institution
Politicians from Belfast
People from Peterborough
Presidents of the English Football League
Secretaries of State for Transport (UK)
UK MPs 1979–1983
UK MPs 1983–1987
UK MPs 1987–1992
UK MPs 1992–1997
UK MPs 1997–2001
UK MPs 2001–2005
University of Iowa faculty
Northern Ireland Office junior ministers
University of Michigan alumni
Life peers created by Elizabeth II
Politicians awarded knighthoods
Association football people awarded knighthoods